Mortimer Herbert Appley (November 21, 1921 – March 29, 2012) was an American psychologist and academic administrator.

Career
He became the chair of the psychology department at Connecticut College for Women in 1952. He went on to hold leadership roles at several other universities over the next two decades, including York University, where he founded and chaired the psychology department. In 1974, he became the sixth president of Clark University, a position he held for ten years; he has been credited with leading Clark out of significant fiscal difficulties during his tenure. He then left Clark to join Harvard University in 1984, first as a visiting scholar and later as a visiting professor.

References

1921 births
2012 deaths
Deaths in Massachusetts
City College of New York alumni
University of Denver alumni
University of Michigan alumni
Connecticut College faculty
Presidents of Clark University
20th-century American psychologists
American academic administrators
American expatriates in Canada
American psychologists